Charles Labie was a 19th-century French playwright.

His plays were presented on the most important Parisian stages of his time, including the Théâtre du Gymnase, the Théâtre de la Gaîté, the Théâtre du Palais-Royal, the Théâtre de la Porte-Saint-Martin, and the Théâtre des Variétés.

Works 
1834: Le Commis et la grisette, one-act comédie en vaudevilles, with Paul de Kock and Charles Monier
1836: Jeune fille et roi, one-act comedy, mingled with songs, after from a short story by Mme Marceline Desbordes-Valmore, with Joanny Augier
1837: Le Cauchemar, revue of 1836
1837: La Nouvelle Héloïse, three-act drama, with Charles Desnoyer
1837: Le Cauchemar, revue lyonnaise of 1836, one-act vaudeville épisodique, with Joanny Augier
1837: Les Giboulées de mars, poisson d'avril en 11 morceaux, with Eugène de Lamerlière
1837: Micaela, ou la Folle de Marie de Bourgogne, three-act drama mingled with singing, from a short story by Alphonse Royer, with J. Augier
1837: L'Ombre de Nicolet, ou De plus fort en plus fort !, one-act vaudeville épisodique, with Desnoyer
1839: Les Femmes laides de Paris, one-act comédie en vaudevilles, with Joanny Augier
1839: La Maupin, ou Une vengeance d'actrice, one-act comédie en vaudevilles
1839: Le Mauvais sujet, one-act comédie en  vaudevilles, with J.Augier and Adolphe Salvat
1840: Le Lion et le rat, two-act comédie en vaudevilles, with Saint-Amand
1841: Coucou !, one-act comédie en vaudevilles
1843: Gloire et perruque, one-act comédie en vaudevilles
1846: Les Fleurs animées, one-act comédie en vaudevilles, with Commerson and Xavier de Montépin
1846: Les Trois baisers, one-act comédie en vaudevilles, with de Montépin
1851: Drinn-Drinn, one-act comédie en vaudevilles, with Édouard Brisebarre and Eugène Nyon
1853: La Pompadour des Porcherons, one-act comédie en vaudevilles
1854: Jean Pain-Mollet, one-act comédie en vaudevilles
1856: La Cigale et la fourmi, saynète
1862: Un Merlan en bonne fortune, one-act comédie en vaudevilles, with Charles de Courcy and Varin
1865: Roland à Pont-de-Vaux, méli-mélo de grande et de petite musique in 4 acts
undated: Une nuit de Venise, grand scene in 6 parts

References

External links 
 Charles Labie on data.bnf.fr

19th-century French dramatists and playwrights
Year of birth missing
Year of death missing